De Hoop is a gristmill in Almelo, Netherlands. The mill was built in 1870 with use of a demolished mill from 1797 and was rebuilt after a fire in 1910.

References

Flour mills in the Netherlands
Windmills in Overijssel